Shirley Montag Almon (February 6, 1935 – September 29, 1975) was an American economist noted for the Almon Lag.

Early life and education 
Almon was born on February 6, 1935, in Saxonburg, Pennsylvania, the oldest of seven children of Harold and Dorothea Montag. She was educated at Goucher College, Baltimore, and then for her PhD at Harvard University (1964). A core element of her PhD was published in Econometrica (1965) and introduced the now famous technique for estimating distributed lags.

Career 
She went on to work at the Women's Bureau, the National Bureau of Economic Research, The Federal Reserve Bank of San Francisco, the Federal Reserve Board and at both Wesley College and Harvard University. Her most noted post was her appointment to the staff of the President's Council of Economic Advisors in 1966.

Selected publications

Personal life 
She married Clopper Almon Jr. on June 14, 1958. She was diagnosed with a brain tumor in December 1967 after four years of various symptoms, and died on September 29, 1975, in College Park, Maryland.

References 

1935 births
1975 deaths
Economists from Pennsylvania
American women economists
Deaths from brain cancer in the United States
People from Butler County, Pennsylvania
Goucher College alumni
Harvard University alumni
20th-century American economists
20th-century American women scientists
20th-century American scientists
Harvard University faculty